Cyrtodactylus jaegeri is a species of gecko, a lizard in the family Gekkonidae. The species is endemic to Laos.

Etymology
The specific name, jaegeri, is in honor of German arachnologist Peter Jäger.

Geographic range
C jaegeri is found in Khammouane Province, Laos.

Habitat

Description

Reproduction
The mode of reproduction of C. jaegeri is unknown.

References

Cyrtodactylus
Reptiles of Laos
Reptiles described in 2014